Kairyūyama Teruhisa (born Kannojo Aoki; August 28, 1939 - September 10, 1986) was a sumo wrestler from Shōwa, Akita, Japan. He made his professional debut in March 1956 and reached the top division in July 1960. His highest rank was sekiwake. He won eight gold stars against grand champion yokozuna in the course of his career. Upon retirement from active competition he became an elder in the Japan Sumo Association under the name Kiriyama. He left the Sumo Association in December 1980.

Career record
The Kyushu tournament was first held in 1957, and the Nagoya tournament in 1958.

See also
Glossary of sumo terms
List of past sumo wrestlers
List of sumo tournament second division champions
List of sekiwake

References

1939 births
Japanese sumo wrestlers
Sumo people from Akita Prefecture
Sekiwake
1986 deaths